Science Fiction Theatre was an American science fiction anthology television series that was produced by Ivan Tors and Maurice Ziv and originally aired in syndication. It premiered on April 9, 1955 and ended on April 6, 1957, with a total of 78 episodes over the course of 2 seasons.

General
From 1955 to 1957, Science Fiction Theatre, a semi-documentary television series, explored the what if's of modern science. Placing an emphasis on science before fiction, television viewers were treated to a variety of complex challenges from mental telepathy, robots, man-eating ants, killer trees, man's first flight into space and time travel. Hosted by Truman Bradley, a radio/TV announcer and 1940s film actor, each episode featured stories which had an extrapolated scientific or pseudo scientific emphasis based on actual scientific data available at the time. Typically, the stories related to the life or work of scientists, engineers, inventors, and explorers, the program concentrated on such concepts as space flight, robots, telepathy, flying saucers, time travel, and the intervention of extraterrestrials in human affairs. With but few exceptions, most of the stories were original concepts based on articles from recent issues of Scientific American. Issues of that magazine can also be seen on Truman Bradley's desk in a number of episodes.

The first season was filmed on 35mm Eastmancolor negative, which was then not considered the best color available for television, often fading over time due to vinegar deterioration. Syndication packages for a second season was renewed at an 80 percent retention ratio, borderline for color production. In March 1956, producer Ivan Tors agreed with Frederic Ziv to produce the program in black and white to offset production expenses in return for a second season.

Like the syndicated Out There and Tales of Tomorrow anthology series before it, Science Fiction Theatre was a predecessor to later science fiction anthology shows such as The Twilight Zone and The Outer Limits.

The show had no fixed cast other than the host, although a number of actors appeared in multiple episodes in different roles. Dick Foran, Marshall Thompson, Dabbs Greer, Arthur Franz, Whit Bissell and Bruce Bennett appeared in more episodes than most. The show also featured stars such as Basil Rathbone, Kenneth Tobey, Victor Jory, Gene Barry, DeForest Kelley, Phyllis Coates and Vincent Price. Edmund Gwenn and Ruth Hussey were  the highest paid actors for the series, $2,500 each for a three-day filming, followed by Gene Lockhart, Don DeFore and Howard Duff who were paid $2,000 each. Most actors were paid between $150 to $500 depending on the size of their role.

Intro and outro
Each episode was introduced by a stirring brass, string, and woodwind fanfare (most likely composed by Ray Bloch, longtime music director for Ed Sullivan), while the camera panned over a science laboratory. Then, Truman Bradley showed a simple scientific experiment which was related to the topic of that week's show. Bradley's demonstrations were often staged, but yielded results consistent with the outcome of true experiments. He was always careful to point out that the story presented was fictional: that "it did not happen".

The pilot episode was filmed in July 1954, but Bradley's on-screen duties were not filmed until September 11, which also included off-screen narration for the pilot and the second episode produced, "Y-O-R-D-", which did not go into production until December 1954. Bradley's duties included visits to the studio for hosting assignments, often filmed in batches of two, three and four episodes in a single day. On February 28, 1955, for example, Herbert Strock directed Bradley for all the pick-ups and off-screen narrations for episodes three, four and five. Bradley returned to the studio two weeks later for pick-ups and off-screen narration for episodes six and seven. After the first two episodes were filmed, an oversight was discovered: Bradley wore a different tie on September 11, 1954 and December 1954. Afterwards, Bradley followed instructions to wear the same suit and same tie for every episode moving forward.

Because of the limited budgets and intense production schedules of ZIV episodic television shows, most of the scientific, and not-so-scientific apparatus appears again and again as props with many different functions. A few of the electrical gadgets such as the computerized chess game, were fake—magnets inside the chess pieces with a technician under the table to move the pieces. One anti-gravity device featured in the episodes "Beyond" and "Y-O-R-D" was a primary device for a key scene in Earth vs. the Flying Saucers (1956). Posters, paintings and electronic gadgets appeared that were used previously as props in producer Ivan Tors' The Magnetic Monster (1953), Riders to the Stars (1954) and Gog (1954). The Bendix Aviation Corporation supplied computer equipment seen in the episode "Survival in Box Canyon". Garco the Robot, used to publicize the Rocky Jones, Space Ranger television series, and featured prominently in a 1957 Disneyland episode, was featured in the episode "Time is Just a Place".

Broadcast
The program never aired over a network. All 78 half-hour episodes were syndicated across the country in package deals of 39 episodes each. This meant the program could air on Saturday evening over a television station in Kalamazoo, Michigan, while the program aired on Wednesday evenings over a station in Newark, New Jersey. Every station featured regional sponsorship and depending on the price tag, Truman Bradley was hired to film commercials for those local spots as inserts. The program was re-titled Beyond The Limits for later syndication in the 1960s.

From 1996 to 1998, Science Fiction Theatre aired weekly on Friday evenings over the Sci-Fi Channel on cable TV. The picture quality was above average and the same provided to PBS stations in the 1980s. While PBS aired the program uncut and unedited, Sci-Fi Channel aired the episode in abbreviated form (21 and one half minutes instead of 26) to make more room for commercials.

Influence
In the 1985 film Back to the Future, Science Fiction Theatre is mentioned as George McFly's favorite television program, from which Marty McFly gains the idea to dress up as an alien in order to scare George into asking his mother Lorraine to the school dance.

Episodes

Series overview

Season 1 (1955–56)

Season 2 (1956–57)

Home release 
Timeless Media Group released the complete series on Region 1 DVD on May 12, 2015. While the episodes on the DVD box set are uncut, they include new video transfers using a "one-light" system causing the episodes to appear slightly darker than telecasts of the past two decades. This generated complaints among fans for being unable to see the events unfold in night-time scenes that were already tinted dark to simulate action under partial moonlight. The same "one-light" system was used to convert Men Into Space, another Ziv-TV production, which aired over Comet TV but has yet to be released on DVD.

References

External links
 
 Science Fiction Theatre – overview
 
 Science Fiction Theatre − episode guide
 Science Fiction Theatre − episode list at CVTA
 Science Fiction Theatre − most episodes on YouTube
 Science Fiction Theatre -- The Thunderchild

1955 American television series debuts
1957 American television series endings
1950s American science fiction television series
1950s American anthology television series
Black-and-white American television shows
English-language television shows
First-run syndicated television programs in the United States
Television series by MGM Television
Science fiction anthology television series